Arcobacter cloacae is a species of bacteria first isolated from sewage. Its type strain is SW28-13T (=CECT 7834T = LMG 26153T).

References

Further reading
Yesilmen, Simten, et al. "Prevalence and antimicrobial susceptibility of Arcobacter species in cow milk, water buffalo milk and fresh village cheese."International journal of food microbiology 188 (2014): 11-14.
Levican, Arturo, et al. "Arcobacter ebronensis sp. nov. and Arcobacter aquimarinus sp. nov., two new species isolated from marine environment."Systematic and Applied Microbiology 38.1 (2015): 30-35.
Giacometti, Federica, et al. "Characterization of Arcobacter suis isolated from water buffalo (Bubalus bubalis) milk." Food Microbiology 51 (2015): 186–191.
Fisher, Jenny C., et al. "Population dynamics and ecology of Arcobacter in sewage." Frontiers in microbiology 5 (2014).

External links
LPSN

Campylobacterota
Bacteria described in 2013